Stari (Slavic languages, 'Old One') may refer to:

 Stari, a rural locality in Babushkinsky District of Vologda Oblast of Russia
 Stari, a nickname of Đuro Pucar
 Stari, a nickname of Josip Broz Tito

See also 
 Southern tick-associated rash illness